Uneek Havana Cigar Company, also known as Sprecht Clothing Company, is a historic factory building located at Blooming Glen, Hilltown Township, Bucks County, Pennsylvania. It was built between 1907 and 1910, and is a 2 1/2-story, rectangular brick building measuring 80 feet by 32 feet.  It sits on a stucco covered stone foundation and has a low-pitched gable roof with broad overhangs reflective of the Arts and Crafts movement.  It was built and occupied by a cigar manufacturer until 1919, after which it housed a clothing manufacturer into the 1950s. It then housed various light manufacturing activities until 2004.

It was added to the National Register of Historic Places in 2007.

Gallery

References

Industrial buildings and structures on the National Register of Historic Places in Pennsylvania
Industrial buildings completed in 1910
Buildings and structures in Bucks County, Pennsylvania
Historic cigar factories
Tobacco buildings in the United States
National Register of Historic Places in Bucks County, Pennsylvania